Events in the year 2015 in Trinidad and Tobago.

Incumbents
 President: Anthony Carmona
 Prime Minister: Keith Rowley
 Chief Justice: Ivor Archie

Events
 2015 Trinidad and Tobago general election

Deaths
5 January – Martin Joseph, 65, Minister of National Security (2003–2010), drowned.
15 January – Raoul Pantin, 71, journalist, playwright, and screenwriter (Bim), survivor of the Jamaat al Muslimeen coup attempt.
21 January – Emmanuel Carter, 85, President of the Senate (1990–1995), acting President (1990) during the Jamaat al Muslimeen coup attempt.
18 August – Russell Henderson, 91, Trinidad and Tobago-born jazz musician.
11 December – Altaff Mungrue, 81, Trinidad and Tobago-born English cricketer.
18 December – Carl Furlonge, 83, Trinidad and Tobago cricketer.

References

 
2010s in Trinidad and Tobago
Years of the 21st century in Trinidad and Tobago
Trinidad and Tobago
Trinidad and Tobago